Platycerus caprea is a species of beetle, from the subfamily Lucaninae of family Lucanidae. It was discovered by Charles De Geer in 1774, and was thus the first known member of its genus.

Appearance 
It has a dark blue body 10–13 mm in length, which is smaller than that of Platycerus caraboides, with which they are easy to confuse.

Geographical distribution 
It is Eurasian, and can be found in the Ural Mountains as well as in Turkey.

References 

Lucaninae
Beetles described in 1774
Taxa named by Charles De Geer